The Tri-Valley Conference (TVC) is a 14-member high school athletic conference located in southeastern Ohio.  The 14 Ohio high school conference members are affiliated with the Ohio High School Athletic Association (OHSAA). The conference is divided into two divisions based on school size.  The Ohio Division features the larger schools and the Hocking Division features the smaller schools.

Ohio Division

Hocking Division

Former members

History

The TVC was established in 1969, but football did not start as a league sport until the following year, 1970.  The league has grown considerably with aggressive expansion throughout most of its history.

The following is a timeline of when schools were added to the league.  All years listed refer to the fall of that year.  Example: 1969 means the fall of 1969, or the 1969–1970 school year.

1969 - The four charter members:

Belpre Golden Eagles
Federal Hocking Lancers
Vinton County Vikings
Warren Warriors

1970:  Nelsonville-York leaves the SEOAL to join the TVC as the fifth league member.  This is also the first year football is a league sport.  The TVC looked like this for the four-year period from 1970 to 1973:

Belpre Golden Eagles
Federal Hocking Lancers
Nelsonville-York Buckeyes
Vinton County Vikings
Warren Warriors

1974:  Alexander joins the TVC as the sixth league member.  The TVC looked like this for the four-year period from 1974 to 1977:

Alexander Spartans
Belpre Golden Eagles
Federal Hocking Lancers
Nelsonville-York Buckeyes
Vinton County Vikings
Warren Warriors

1978:  Trimble joins the TVC as the seventh league member.  The TVC looked like this for the four-year period from 1978 to 1981:

Alexander Spartans
Belpre Golden Eagles
Federal Hocking Lancers
Nelsonville-York Buckeyes
Trimble Tomcats
Vinton County Vikings
Warren Warriors

1982:  Wellston leaves the SEOAL and joins the TVC as the eighth league member.  The TVC looked like this in 1982:

Alexander Spartans
Belpre Golden Eagles
Federal Hocking Lancers
Nelsonville-York Buckeyes
Trimble Tomcats
Vinton County Vikings
Warren Warriors
Wellston Golden Rockets

1983:  Meigs leaves the SEOAL and joins the TVC and Miller also joins the TVC as the ninth and tenth members.  The TVC looked like this for the three-year period from 1983 to 1985:
Alexander Spartans
Belpre Golden Eagles
Federal Hocking Lancers
Meigs Marauders
Miller Falcons
Nelsonville-York Buckeyes
Trimble Tomcats
Vinton County Vikings
Warren Warriors
Wellston Golden Rockets

1986:  Warren leaves the TVC to join the SEOAL, bringing league membership down to nine schools.  The TVC looked like this for the 7-year period from 1986 to 1992:

Alexander Spartans
Belpre Golden Eagles
Federal Hocking Lancers
Meigs Marauders
Miller Falcons
Nelsonville-York Buckeyes
Trimble Tomcats
Vinton County Vikings
Wellston Golden Rockets

1993:  The TVC is divided into two divisions, TVC OHIO and TVC HOCKING.  Ohio and Hocking being the names of the rivers that run through the conference - the Ohio River and the Hocking River.  The larger schools are placed in the TVC OHIO and the smaller schools are placed in the TVC HOCKING.  Eastern and Southern are added as the tenth and eleventh league members.  The TVC looked like this for the 4-year period from 1993 to 1996:

TVC OHIO
Belpre Golden Eagles
Meigs Marauders
Nelsonville-York Buckeyes
Vinton County Vikings
Wellston Golden Rockets

TVC HOCKING
Alexander Spartans
Eastern Eagles
Federal Hocking Lancers
Miller Falcons
Southern Tornadoes
Trimble Tomcats

1997:  Waterford is added as the twelfth league member.  Waterford joins the TVC Hocking, bumping Alexander up to the TVC Ohio.  The TVC experienced its longest streak of no league changes (11 years) and  looked like this for the 11-year period from 1997 to 2007:

TVC OHIO
Alexander Spartans
Belpre Golden Eagles
Meigs Marauders
Nelsonville-York Buckeyes
Vinton County Vikings
Wellston Golden Rockets

TVC HOCKING
Eastern Eagles
Federal Hocking Lancers
Miller Falcons
Southern Tornadoes
Trimble Tomcats
Waterford Wildcats

2008:  Athens leaves the SEOAL and joins the TVC Ohio as the thirteenth league member.  The TVC looks like this for the two-year period from 2008 to 2009:

TVC OHIO
Alexander Spartans
Athens Bulldogs
Belpre Golden Eagles
Meigs Marauders
Nelsonville-York Buckeyes
Vinton County Vikings
Wellston Golden Rockets

TVC HOCKING
Eastern Eagles
Federal Hocking Lancers
Miller Falcons
Southern Tornadoes
Trimble Tomcats
Waterford Wildcats

2010:  South Gallia and Wahama join the TVC Hocking as the fourteenth and fifteenth league members.  Wahama becomes the first school located in the State of West Virginia to join the previously all-Ohio conference.  Belpre, due to declining enrollment, moves down to the TVC Hocking.  The TVC looked like this for 4 years from 2010 to 2014:

TVC OHIO
Alexander Spartans
Athens Bulldogs
Meigs Marauders
Nelsonville-York Buckeyes
Vinton County Vikings
Wellston Golden Rockets

TVC HOCKING
Belpre Golden Eagles
Eastern Eagles
Federal Hocking Lancers
Miller Falcons
South Gallia Rebels
Southern Tornadoes
Trimble Tomcats
Wahama White Falcons
Waterford Wildcats

2014:  River Valley leaves the OVC and joins the TVC as the 16th league member and becomes a part of the TVC OHIO. The TVC looked like this for 6 years from 2014 to 2019:

TVC OHIO
Alexander Spartans
Athens Bulldogs
Meigs Marauders
Nelsonville-York Buckeyes
River Valley Raiders
Vinton County Vikings
Wellston Golden Rockets

TVC HOCKING 
Belpre Golden Eagles
Eastern Eagles
Federal Hocking Lancers
Miller Falcons
South Gallia Rebels
Southern Tornadoes
Trimble Tomcats
Wahama White Falcons
Waterford Wildcats

2020: Miller leaves the TVC to join the MSL Cardinal, and Wahama leaves to join the LKC as the league goes back down to 14 members. As of 2020, the TVC looks like this:

TVC OHIO
Alexander Spartans
Athens Bulldogs
Meigs Marauders
Nelsonville-York Buckeyes
River Valley Raiders
Vinton County Vikings
Wellston Golden Rockets

TVC HOCKING
Belpre Golden Eagles
Eastern Eagles
Federal Hocking Lancers
South Gallia Rebels
Southern Tornadoes
Trimble Tomcats
Waterford Wildcats

2023: South Gallia will leave the TVC to join the SOC, bringing the league back down to 13 members. In 2023, the TVC will tentatively look like this:

TVC OHIO
Alexander Spartans
Athens Bulldogs
Meigs Marauders
Nelsonville-York Buckeyes
River Valley Raiders
Vinton County Vikings
Wellston Golden Rockets

TVC HOCKING
Belpre Golden Eagles
Eastern Eagles
Federal Hocking Lancers
Southern Tornadoes
Trimble Tomcats
Waterford Wildcats

References

Ohio high school sports conferences
Sports organizations established in 1969